Gail Sontgerath (born March 11, 1944) is an American gymnast. She was the 1960 U.S. Women's National Amateur Athletic Union Gymnastics Champion. She competed in six events at the 1960 Summer Olympics.

Raised in Dover, New Jersey, Sontgerath moved to Florida as a child, graduating from Palm Beach High School and Florida State University. In March 1961, she appeared as a mystery contestant on the television quiz show To Tell the Truth, where she was described as the highest scoring U.S. women's gymnast at the 1960 Summer Olympics.

References

External links
 

1944 births
Living people
American female artistic gymnasts
Florida State University alumni
People from Dover, New Jersey
Sportspeople from Morris County, New Jersey
Olympic gymnasts of the United States
Gymnasts at the 1960 Summer Olympics
Gymnasts from New Jersey
21st-century American women